Six ships of the Royal Navy have borne the name HMS Janus, after Janus, the two-faced God of Roman mythology:

  was a 44-gun fifth rate launched in 1778. She was renamed HMS Dromedary later that year, and was wrecked in 1800 on the Parasol Rocks in Trinidad.
  was a 32-gun fifth rate, previously the Dutch Argo.
  was a wood paddle sloop launched in 1844 and sold in 1856.
  was a  wood screw gunboat launched in 1856. She was used as a coal lighter from 1869 and was renamed YC 6. She was sold in 1917.
  was a  launched in 1895 and reclassified as an  destroyer in 1913. She was sold in 1914.
  was a J-class destroyer launched in 1938 and sunk in 1944.

Royal Navy ship names